Alison Smith (born 8 April 1970) is a British former professional tennis player.

Smith, who comes from Staffordshire, played on the international tour in the early 1990s. She featured in the women's doubles main draw at the 1994 Wimbledon Championships, partnering Gaby Coorengel of the Netherlands.

ITF finals

Singles: 1 (1–0)

Doubles: 10 (4–6)

References

External links
  (includes data of an Australian player of the late 1990s with the same name)
 

1970 births
Living people
British female tennis players
English female tennis players
Tennis people from Staffordshire